Somatosensory & Motor Research is a peer-reviewed medical journal that covers all topics relating to the neural bases for somatic sensation, somatic motor function, somatic motor integration, and modeling thereof. The journal has been published quarterly by Informa since 1983. According to the Journal Citation Reports, the journal had a 2016 impact factor of 0.909.

Editor
The editor in chief of Somatosensory & Motor Research is Thomas A. Woolsey (Washington University School of Medicine, USA).

Abstracting and indexing
Somatosensory & Motor Research is abstracted and indexed in Biological Abstracts, Current Contents EMBASE/Excerpta Medica, Index Medicus/MEDLINE, PsycINFO, Science Citation Index, and Scopus.

References

Neurology journals
Taylor & Francis academic journals
Quarterly journals
Publications established in 1983
English-language journals